The three teams in this group played against each other on a home-and-away basis. The group winner Yugoslavia qualified for the 1954 FIFA World Cup held in Switzerland.

Group 10

Results

Team stats

Head coach:  Milorad Arsenijević,  Aleksandar Tirnanić,  Leo Lemešić (together)

Head coach:  Kostas Negrepontis (first and second match),  Ioannis Chelmis (third and fourth match)

External links
FIFA official page
RSSSF - 1954 World Cup Qualification
Allworldcup

Ten10
1952–53 in Yugoslav football
Qual
1952–53 in Greek football
1953–54 in Greek football
1953–54 in Israeli football